is a Japanese former swimmer who competed in the 2000 Summer Olympics and in the 2008 Summer Olympics.

References

1983 births
Living people
Japanese female freestyle swimmers
Japanese female butterfly swimmers
Olympic swimmers of Japan
Swimmers at the 2000 Summer Olympics
Swimmers at the 2008 Summer Olympics
Asian Games medalists in swimming
Swimmers at the 2002 Asian Games
Swimmers at the 2006 Asian Games
World Aquatics Championships medalists in swimming
Asian Games silver medalists for Japan
Asian Games bronze medalists for Japan
Medalists at the 2002 Asian Games
Medalists at the 2006 Asian Games
20th-century Japanese women
21st-century Japanese women